The 2014–15 campaign was Huddersfield Town's third consecutive season in the second tier of English football, the Football League Championship.

After losing their first game of the season, a 4–0 home loss to AFC Bournemouth, manager Mark Robins was relieved of his duties the following day. After 3 weeks of caretaker charge under Academy Manager Mark Lillis, the former Charlton Athletic manager, Chris Powell, was appointed as the new permanent manager on 3 September 2014.

Squad at the end of the season

Kit
The 2014–15 season is the club's second with technical kit supplier Puma. Rekorderlig Cider and Radian B continued their sponsorships of the home and away shirts, respectively.

The new home kit was revealed on 27 June, and features a light blue and white striped shirt, white shorts, and black socks for the fourth year running. The blue stripes on the shirt start below the crest and fade out to a lighter blue at the bottom of the shirt, interrupted by the logo of main sponsor Rekorderlig. A similar gradient pattern flows down the sleeves. The collar and trim of the shirt is in a darker shade of blue. White socks were worn with the home kit during the away game at Wolves in October, where both change strips were deemed to clash with the opposition.

The away kit was revealed on 18 July, and consists of a red and black hooped shirt, black shorts, and red and black hooped socks. The red hoops on the shirt each contain thinner black hoops, and are bounded by thin white hoops, also containing thinner black hoops. Alternative red shorts were worn during the away games at Watford and Fulham.

The limited edition Brazil-esque third kit was revealed on 13 August, consisting of a yellow shirt with blue diagonal pinstripes, blue shorts, and white socks. Like in the previous season, the third kit was introduced to give a Thornton & Ross brand (in this case, Covonia) an airing where the away kit can not be worn, as per their sponsorship agreement with the Club.

The main goalkeeper kit is in a shade of "beetroot purple", with alternative kits in orange, black and green. The black goalkeeper shirt from the previous season also made an appearance on more than one occasion.

|
|
|
|
|
|
|
|
|
|
|

Transfers

In

Loans in

Out

Loans out

Squad statistics

Appearances and goals

|}

Top scorers

Disciplinary record

Match details

Pre-season and friendlies

Overview

Championship

Results summary

Results by round

League table

Matches

FA Cup

League Cup

Under 21s

U21 Professional Development League 2 North

U21 Premier League Cup

References

Huddersfield Town A.F.C. seasons
Huddersfield